The Colonial Dames of America (CDA) is an American organization composed of women who are descended from an ancestor who lived in British America from 1607 to 1775, and was of service to the colonies by either holding public office, being in the military, or serving the Colonies in some other "eligible" way.  The CDA is listed as an approved lineage society with the Hereditary Society Community of the United States of America.

The National Headquarters is at Mount Vernon Hotel Museum in New York City, which was purchased by the CDA in 1924.

History 
The organization was founded in 1890, shortly before the founding of two similar societies, The National Society of the Colonial Dames of America and the Daughters of the American Revolution.

Notable members 
 Lillie Stella Acer Ballagh, founder of Matinee Musical Club, Los Angeles
 Florence Anderson Clark (1835–1918), author, newspaper editor, librarian, university dean
Cynthia Beverley Tucker Washington Coleman (1832–1908), writer and preservationist in Williamsburg, Virginia.
 Elizabeth Jarvis Colt, businesswoman and philanthropist; founder of the Connecticut chapter of CDA
 Laura Dayton Fessenden (1852-1924), author 
 Sallie Foster Harshbarger, active in civic and fraternal work
 Mary Hilliard Hinton, historian, painter, anti-suffragist, and white supremacist
 Alice Curtice Moyer
 Edith Allen Phelps, twice president of the Oklahoma Library Association, the first professional in the Library Science field in the Oklahoma City system
 Adelaide Hamilton (1830-1915), last surviving granddaughter of Alexander Hamilton. She joined the organisation when it was first launched.
 Florence Warfield Sillers, historian and socialite
 Fay Webb-Gardner, First Lady of North Carolina
 Lynn Forney Young, lineage society leader

References

External links
 Official website
 Mount Vernon Hotel Museum
The Hereditary Society Community of the United States of America

Lineage societies
Organizations established in 1890
Women's clubs in the United States